Senvion S.A. (called  REpower Systems SE until 2014) was a German wind turbine manufacturer founded in 2001 in Germany,  majority owned by a private equity firm.
Senvion as REpower Systems, as it was initially called, was established in 2001 through the merger of German wind companies: HSW (Husumer Schiffswerft), the engineering consultancy Pro+Pro (a subsidery of Denker&Wulf and aerodyn Energiesysteme GmbH), the wind turbine manufacturer BWU and Jacobs Energie; and since April 2015 Centerbridge Partners.  It was under the ownership of Suzlon, an India wind turbine manufacturer, from 2007 to 2015.

With equipment pricing under pressure due to auctions, Senvion filed for insolvency in German courts in early April 2019. Senvion sold its 9 GW European service fleet to Siemens Gamesa in October 2019. A Saudi Arabia company acquired the India division of Senvion in 2021.

See also
Hallett Wind Farm
Hoosier Wind Farm
List of offshore wind farms
List of wind turbine manufacturers
Wind power in Germany
Wind power in India

References

External links

Engineering companies of Germany
Companies based in Hamburg
Wind turbine manufacturers
German brands
2001 establishments in Germany